The Konin coal mine is a large mine in the central of Poland in Konin, Greater Poland Voivodeship, 186 km north-west of the capital, Warsaw. Konin represents one of the largest coal reserve in Poland having estimated reserves of 466.4 million tonnes of coal. The annual coal production is around 20 million tonnes.

References

External links
 Official site

Coal mines in Greater Poland Voivodeship
Coal mines in Poland
Open-pit mines